The second cabinet of Thorbjörn Fälldin was the cabinet and Government of Sweden from 12 October 1979 to 22 May 1981.

The cabinet was a coalition majority government consisting of the Centre Party, the Liberal People's Party and the Moderate Party. The cabinet was led by Prime Minister Thorbjörn Fälldin of the Centre Party who had led his party to a second victory in the 1979 general election. Thorbjörn Fälldin had previously been Prime Minister of Sweden from 1976 until his first cabinet resigned in October 1978 following a vote of confidence.

The cabinet resigned on 5 May 1981 (but stayed in office until 22 May 1981) following the withdrawal of the Moderate Party. The cabinet was succeeded by Thorbjörn Fälldin's Third Cabinet.

Ministers 

|}

External links
The Government and the Government Offices of Sweden

1979 establishments in Sweden
Cabinets of Sweden
Politics of Sweden
1981 disestablishments in Sweden
Cabinets established in 1979
Cabinets disestablished in 1981